Terrance Corley Burrus is an American keyboardist, composer,
dj, record producer, conductor, business, realty and fashion designer executive.

Born in Brooklyn, New York, he started touring as a teenager, playing with jazz fusion violinist Michał Urbaniak and singer Jean Carne while still in high school in New York. At that time, Burrus replaced Urbaniak's keyboardist, Barry Eastman (who wrote "You Are My Lady" years later for Freddie Jackson). Burrus was brought to Jean Carne through percussionist-producer Norman Hedman, who was one of Burrus's musical mentors as a child. Later on, through these types of associations, Burrus went on to play with trumpeter Tom Browne, drummer Lenny White, and singer Melba Moore. Recommended by his friend and pianist Kenny Kirkland, who was the keyboardist for Sting during the mid-1980's, Burrus had moved on to play with the great Lena Horne in her award-winning show Lady and Her Music in 1984. The Lena Horne Quintet consisted of Terry on piano and keyboards, Ben Brown on bass, Rodney Jones on guitar, Wilby Fletcher on drums, Ron Bridgewater on saxophone, and music director Linda Twine, and an array of musicians from the London Symphony Orchestra. While still playing for artists, Burrus is releasing solo recordings and concertizing on his own.

In 1983, Terry released his first solo single, called "Love Rockin", for Arista Records; a funk/electro/soul piece written and with all vocals and instruments by Burrus, with high-school buddy Omar Hakim on drums. This was known as Terry Burrus and Transe, and was produced by Burrus and Marcus Miller, another high-school friend. Burrus and Miller, along with drummer Poogie Bell, Bobby Broom, another high-school guitar friend, and Bernard Wright (also a high-school companion), went on to play for an off-Broadway show written by Weldon Irvine in 1977 called Young Gifted And Broke at the Billie Holiday Theater in Brooklyn, New York. Irvine had co-written with Nina Simone the famed song "To Be Young, Gifted and Black". Return To Forever's drummer and jazz fusion pioneer Lenny White joined the "Young Gifted And Broke" crew of musicians as a replacement drummer for Poogie Bell at times, and this is where Burrus became ecstatic over the magic of Lenny White. This was during the high post-Chick Corea Return to Forever season.

As time went on, Terry became a respected recording session artist, playing on recordings of Michael Jackson, Toni Braxton, Janet Jackson, Swing Out Sister, Mariah Carey, The Cardigans, Donna Summer, Lisa Stansfield, Gloria Estefan, Madonna, Aretha Franklin, Phyllis Hyman, Frankie Knuckles, David Morales, Satoshi Tomiie, Todd Terry, and others. Burrus is said to own just about every electric keyboard that has come out since the Wurlitzer electric piano. In addition, Burrus has always been intrigued by the great classical masters, having studied the artistry of Mozart, Beethoven,Handel, and others during his school days in New York, and in his contemporary piano compositions and playing can be heard classical influences. He performs many classical piano recitals around the world as well as playing in the jazz and pop genres.

Burrus has been sideman/music director on many tours of Jazz Explosion, as they were known in the 1980s and 1990s, as well as on soul, dance and gospel concerts with the Harlem Gospel Singers, Gato Barbieri, George Benson, Angela Bofill, Larry Carlton, Bill Withers, Ramsey Lewis, Crown Heights Affair, Chaka Khan, Ronnie Laws, The Main Ingredient, Johnny Kemp, Stanley Clarke, Noel Pointer, Bobbi Humphrey. Burrus also wrote and produced with the president of Philadelphia International Records, Kenny Gamble, including "Living In Confusion" and "Forever With You" for Phyllis Hyman. Burrus wrote "I Just Love You So Much" for Billy Paul and wrote and produced "Love Goddess" for Lonnie Liston Smith. Burrus also wrote and produced "I'll Wait for You" and "The One And Only Lady In My Life" for Virgin recording group Burrell, among other compositions and productions to his credit.

With contributions to many remixes of artists from the 1980s to the present day, reinforcing the sound of house music and electronic music, his early associations working with Def Mix Productions, Frankie Knuckles, David Morales, Satoshi Tomei and Todd Terry, Junior Vasquez, Paul Simpson, Winston Jones, Dave Shaw, Jellybean Benitez, Tony Humphries, François K and many other international and American DJ producers have rooted him well on the dance-floor and in the remix world. Burrus has created sounds in electronica that he has extended into the worlds of Techno, Trance, Ambient, World Music and more, his piano style especially being prevalent and dominant in the 1990s on many recordings by well-known and new artists around the world.

Early life 
Terry Burrus's interest in the organ and piano began at age five in Brooklyn at the Washington Temple Church of God In Christ, a Pentecostal church under the founder, Pastor Bishop F.D. Washington. Terry's mother, Carter Lee, and father, James, had been singing in the choir there since the mid-1950s. When Terry was five, his parents enrolled him at the Alfred Miller Music School, where he began playing gospel hymns a year or so later.

He studied music in New York City at the La Guardia School of Music And Art  and later attended Long Island University in New York. He gained a deeper affection for jazz, improvising, classical, and composing. All the time while in school, he was recording in his personal home recording studio and public studios as well as playing concerts worldwide as a sideman with Jean Carne, Michael Urbaniak, Tom Browne, Stanley Turrentine, Lenny White, Lena Horne, Phyllis Hyman, Crown Heights Affair, and The Main Ingredient with Cuba Gooding. Terry Burrus always credits Sticks Evans, his junior high school music teacher at John Coleman I.S. 271 Junior High School in Brooklyn, for giving him encouragement and inspiration as a youngster. Stick Evans played drums for Aretha Franklin and Sammy Davis, Jr. Apart from being his teacher and mentor, Stick Evans regarded Terry as a little brother or even a son. Through this relationship, Burrus acquired the strength to go on in the music world. In the late 1980s, Burrus moved into a newly built apartment in mid-Manhattan in the area where Evans lived for many years until his death in 1994.

Discography

As a leader
Bust It Out (1989; Easystreet)
Dance to the Mix (EP) (1990; Easystreet)
Urban Smooth Jazz (2006; Ichiban)
Mighty Mouth Vavoom (1985; Zakia/Bee Pee)
Invisible Weapon (1994; Startrak)
Love Rockin (1983; Arista)
Nation 2 Nation (1992; Ichiban)
Free Spirit (1991; Ichiban-EMI)
Soul of Jazz (1996; Ichiban)
I Am for You (1996; Lovelight)
Acid Jazz Hipabop Project (1994; Lovelight)
At the Konzerthaus in Dortmund (2007; Blue Corner)
Global Dancefloor Booked (2008; Lovelight)

As a sideman
George Benson - Big Boss Band with the Count Basie Orchestra (1990; Warner Bros.)
Lonnie Liston Smith - Love Goddess (1990; Startrak/Ichiban)
Tom Browne - Yours Truly (1981; GRP/Arista)
Michael Jackson - You Are Not Alone (1995; Epic)
Cardigans - Love Fool (1997; Motor/Mercury)
Mary J. Blige - Everything (1997; MCA/Universal)
Phyllis Hyman - Prime of My Life (1992; Zoo Entertainment)
Phyllis Hyman - Living All Alone (1986; Philadelphia International)
Lisa Stansfield - Change [Ultimate Club Mix] (Remixed by Frankie Knuckles) (1991, Arista)

References

 Jazz Review article Biography (Skelle, Belgium)
 Billboard Dance
 Hidden Cabaret Time Square Chronicles (2020) 
 Cheryl Lacey Donovan (2015).  Blog Talk Radio
 Paris Events
 Broadway World Bonnie Rose, Stephen S. Miller (2021).
 OndaJazz
 Fran James Cross Rhythms (1992). Terry Burrus Review
Terry Burrus Soul Of Jazz Review. Peter's Contemporary Jazz (1996).
 Lena Horne Quintet https://sentinelarchivemrdia.blogspot.com
Allmusic.com

External links
 

Year of birth missing (living people)
21st-century classical composers
21st-century classical pianists
21st-century American male musicians
21st-century American pianists
African-American classical composers
American classical composers
African-American classical pianists
African-American male classical composers
American male classical composers
American classical pianists
American keyboardists
American male pianists
American pop pianists
Classical musicians from New York (state)
Living people
Musicians from Brooklyn
21st-century African-American musicians